Charles Alfred Campbell (2 July 1914 – 8 June 1963) was a Canadian rower. He competed in the men's single sculls event at the 1936 Summer Olympics. He was born in Moose Jaw, Saskatchewan and moved to Toronto in 1927. He died after a heart attack in 1963.

References

1914 births
1963 deaths
Canadian male rowers
Olympic rowers of Canada
Rowers at the 1936 Summer Olympics
Place of birth missing